Charin Bood-Hard (born January 24, 1989) is a Thai professional footballer who plays as a forward for Thai League 4 club Khonkaen United.

Club career

References

External links
 Players Profile.com 

1989 births
Living people
Charin Boodhad
Charin Boodhad
Association football forwards
Charin Boodhad
Charin Boodhad
Charin Boodhad
Charin Boodhad
Charin Boodhad